The 2005 FA Women's Cup Final was the 35th final of the FA Women's Cup, England's primary cup competition for women's football teams. It was the 12th final to be held under the direct control of the Football Association (FA) and was known as the FA Women's Cup Final in partnership with Nationwide for sponsorship reasons. The final was contested between Charlton Athletic and Everton on 2 May 2005. 

Charlton Athletic entered their third consecutive final having lost the previous two. Everton reached the final for the first time, although an earlier incarnation of the club, known as Leasowe Pacific, had lost the 1988 final and won in 1989.

As top-flight FA Women's Premier League clubs, both Charlton Athletic and Everton entered the competition at the fourth round stage. Charlton Athletic beat Wolverhampton Wanderers, West Ham United, Sunderland and Bristol Rovers to reach the final. Everton faced Bristol City, Leafield Athletic, Chelsea and Arsenal before reaching the final.

Charlton Athletic won the game 1–0, with a 58th-minute goal by Eniola Aluko.

Media

Match programme
The match programme cover was designed by 15-year-old Gillian Prescott, whose illustration won a competition in the Sunday Express newspaper. From a family of noted women's football supporters in the North West, Sheila Parker was her godmother. Prescott, who had cerebral palsy, died in January 2010.

Details

References 

Women's FA Cup finals
FA Women's Cup Final, 2005
FA Women's Cup Final, 2005
2004–05 in English women's football